Albert Bertelin (26 July 1872 – 19 July 1951) was a French composer.

Life 
Born in Paris, Bertelin studied at the Conservatoire de Paris where he was a pupil of Théodore Dubois, Raoul Pugno, Charles-Marie Widor and Jules Massenet. In 1902 he received a 2nd prize for composition at the Prix de Rome, alongside Aymé Kunc and Jean Roger-Ducasse. He then taught counterpoint and fugue at the École César Franck.

Bertelin composed one symphony, one opera, two Oratorios, one Mass, motets, a cello, a violin and a piano concerto and chamber music works. He also published music reviews and several musicological works and was a member of the examination jury of the Conservatoire de Paris.

Bertelin died in Paris in 1951 and was buried at Père Lachaise Cemetery (31st division)

Works 
Goïtza, Opera
Légende de Loreley for Choir and Orchestra
Choral for Orchestra, 1902
Sub umbra Crucis, Oratorio, 1917
In nativitate Domini, Oratorio, 1922
Sonate en mi mineur for cello and piano, 1933
Sonate for violin and piano, 1937

Publications 
Traité de composition musicale, 4 volumes, 1931–34
Traité de contrepoint modal et tonal, 1951
 Les Bases de l’harmonie

External links 
 Notice on Website Musica et Memoria
 

French male classical composers
French opera composers
Prix de Rome for composition
Conservatoire de Paris alumni
20th-century French composers
Musicians from Paris
1872 births
1951 deaths
Burials at Père Lachaise Cemetery
20th-century French male musicians